Ust-Belishevo (Ösbäleş) is a rural locality (a village) in Nagadaksky Selsoviet, Aurgazinsky District, Bashkortostan, Russia. The population was 57 as of 2010. There is 1 street.

Geography 
Ust-Belishevo is located 46 km northeast of Tolbazy (the district's administrative centre) by road. Malaya Ivanovka is the nearest rural locality.

References 

Rural localities in Aurgazinsky District